Brenda Nunns Shoemaker (born September 13, 1945) is a Canadian former tennis player.

Nunns, a doubles champion at the 1965 Canadian championships, was a national representative in the 1966 Federation Cup, featuring in a tie against Great Britain. She is the daughter of Davis Cup player Gilbert Nunns. Her son, David Shoemaker, is CEO of the Canadian Olympic Committee and a former WTA executive.

See also
List of Canada Fed Cup team representatives

References

External links
 
 

1945 births
Living people
Canadian female tennis players